Pratt Regional Airport  is a public airport five miles north of Pratt, in Pratt County, Kansas. Previously known as Pratt Industrial Airport, it is on the site of the former Pratt Army Airfield.

Facilities
Its one runway, 17/35, is 5,500 by 100 feet (1,676 x 30 m). The facility had three  runways: 13/31 (now closed), 04/22 (also closed), and runway 17/35 that has since been shortened by 2500 feet.

In the year ending August 13, 2008 the airport had 11,450 aircraft operations, average 31 per day: 96% general aviation, 3% air taxi, and 1% military. 25 aircraft were then based at this airport: 68% single-engine and 32% multi-engine.

References

External links 
 Pratt Industrial Airport
  from Kansas DOT Airport Directory
 Aerial photo as of 29 September 1991 from USGS The National Map
 

Airports in Kansas
Buildings and structures in Pratt County, Kansas